The control variates method is a variance reduction technique used in Monte Carlo methods. It exploits information about the errors in estimates of known quantities to reduce the error of an estimate of an unknown quantity.

Underlying principle
Let the unknown parameter of interest be , and assume we have a statistic  such that the expected value of m is μ: , i.e. m is an unbiased estimator for μ. Suppose we calculate another statistic  such that  is a known value. Then

The variance of the resulting estimator  is

where
        

This is equivalent to solving a certain least squares system; therefore this technique is also known as regression sampling.

When the expectation of the control variable, is not known analytically, it is still possible to increase the precision in estimating  (for a given fixed simulation budget), provided that the two conditions are met: 1) evaluating  is significantly cheaper than computing ; 2) the magnitude of the correlation coefficient  is close to unity.

Example

We would like to estimate

using Monte Carlo integration.

and U follows a uniform distribution [0, 1].
Then the estimate is given by

Now we introduce  as a control variate with a known expected value  and combine the two into a new estimate

Using  realizations and an estimated optimal coefficient  we obtain the following results

The variance was significantly reduced after using the control variates technique.

See also
 Antithetic variates
 Importance sampling

Notes

References
 Ross, Sheldon M. (2002) Simulation 3rd edition 
 Averill M. Law & W. David Kelton (2000), Simulation Modeling and Analysis, 3rd edition. 
 S. P. Meyn (2007) Control Techniques for Complex Networks, Cambridge University Press. .   Downloadable draft (Section 11.4: Control variates and shadow functions)

Monte Carlo methods
Statistical randomness
Computational statistics
Variance reduction